De Norsemen Kclub of Nigeria is a Nigerian confraternity, founded at University of Port Harcourt, Rivers State, Nigeria by students with the nicknames of "Risenangel De Chamelus" "Fons et Origo", "Captain Trupence Njamena" and "Eric the Red". The group was founded in 1985 and registered with the Corporate Affairs Commission of Nigeria as a social charity.

Relationship with Supreme Vikings Confraternity 
Obi Ijere, a high-ranking leader of the Supreme Vikings Confraternity, a leading group in the 1990s conflict in the Niger Delta, stated in an interview that the confraternity and De Norsemen Kclub of Nigeria were in fact not the same group. This is very correct because all Vikings are norsemen but not all norsemen are vikings However, in an official statement in August 2009 the National President of the organisation, Bond Ohuche, dismissed as "fallacious... criminal and mischievous" any association of the organisation with the conflict in the Niger Delta.

Organisation 
Membership of De Norsemen Kclub of Nigeria is open to all Nigerian graduates without regards to religious, ethnic or social backgrounds. These are set by the De Norsemen Supreme Council, and decided by the Governor on individual applications. De Norsemen Klub initiates every two years, and all applicants must be sponsored by a fraternal brother who has been a member for at least three years. For admission to the De Norsemen Kclub of Nigeria, applicants must have a baccalaureate degree with a grade point average of at least 3.0 out of 4.0. Applicants also undergo a background check (no criminal record) and series of interviews before admission, must have university degree or O.N.D, H.N.D or equivalent. Members and intending members must that they do not have a criminal record and good and credible means of livelihood

The structure of De Norsemen Kclub of Nigeria is a hierarchical brotherhood, themed as a ship with a crew of brothers and sailors.

References 

 Rotimi, Adewale. , Nordic Journal of African Studies 14(1): 79–98 (2005)

External links
 De Norsemen Kclub of Nigeria
 Adewumi Rowland
 Archived news articles on Nigerian campus cults religionnewsblog.com
 Discussion board on Nigerian death fraternities

Student societies in Nigeria
Confraternities in Nigeria